This article displays the qualifying draw of the 2011 BMW Open.

Players

Seeds

Qualifiers

Lucky losers
  Denis Gremelmayr

Qualifying draw

First qualifier

Second qualifier

Third qualifier

Fourth qualifier

References
 Qualifying draw

BMW Open - qualifying
2011 BMW Open